There are at least 23 species of clubmosses and 153 species of mosses found in the state of Montana in the United States. The Montana Natural Heritage Program has identified a number of clubmoss and moss species as species of concern.

Clubmosses

Clubmosses
Class: Lycopodiopsida
Order: Lycopodiales Family: Lycopodiaceae
 Alpine clubmoss, Diphasiastrum alpinum
 Chinese clubmoss, Huperzia chinensis
 Common clubmoss, Lycopodium clavatum
 Northern bog clubmoss, Lycopodiella inundata
 One-cone clubmoss, Lycopodium lagopus
 Pacific clubmoss, Huperzia haleakalae
 Sitka clubmoss, Diphasiastrum sitchense
 Stiff clubmoss, Spinulum annotinum
 Trailing clubmoss, Diphasiastrum complanatum
 Tree groundpine, Dendrolycopodium dendroideum
 Western clubmoss, Huperzia occidentalis

Quillworts
Class: Isoetopsida
Order: Isoetales, Family: Isoetaceae
 Bolander's quillwort, Isoetes bolanderi
 Howell's quillwort, Isoetes howellii
 Nuttall's quillwort, Isoetes nuttallii
 Spiny-spored quillwort, Isoetes echinospora
 Western quillwort, Isoetes occidentalis

Spike-mosses

Class: Isoetopsida
Order: Selaginellales, Family: Selaginellaceae
 Lesser spikemoss, Selaginella densa
 Low spikemoss, Selaginella selaginoides
 Wallace's spikemoss, Selaginella wallacei
 Watson's spikemoss, Selaginella watsonii

Mosses

Granite mosses
Class: Andreaeopsida Order: Andreaeales, Family: Andreaeaceae
 Blytt's andreaea moss, Andreaea blyttii

Peat mosses

Class: Sphagnopsida
Order: Sphagnales, Family: Sphagnaceae
 Contorted sphagnum, Sphagnum contortum
 Flat-leaved bogmoss, Sphagnum platyphyllum
 Flat-topped bogmoss, Sphagnum fallax
 Fringed bogmoss, Sphagnum fimbriatum
 Girgensohn's sphagnum, Sphagnum girgensohnii
 Low sphagnum, Sphagnum compactum
 Magellan's peat moss, Sphagnum magellanicum
 Mendocino peat moss, Sphagnum mendocinum
 Barrowleaf peat moss, Sphagnum angustifolium
 Rusty peat moss, Sphagnum fuscum
 Sphagnum moss, Sphagnum centrale
 Streamside sphagnum moss, Sphagnum riparium
 Wulf's peat moss, Sphagnum wulfianum

Haircap mosses
Class: Polytrichopsida
Order: Polytrichales, Family: Polytrichaceae
 Lyall's polytrichum moss, Meiotrichum lyallii
 Northern haircap, Polytrichum sexangulare
 Oligotrichum moss, Oligotrichum aligerum

True mosses

Class: Bryopsida
 Order: Hypnales, Family: Amblystegiaceae
 Campylium moss, Campylium polygamum
 Cardot's campylium moss, Campylium cardotii
 Hygroamblystegium moss, Hygroamblystegium noterophilum
 Hygrohypnum moss, Hygrohypnum cochlearifolium
 Hygrohypnum moss, Hygrohypnum duriusculum
 Limprichtia moss, Limprichtia revolvens
 Pointed spear-moss, Calliergonella cuspidata
 Pseudocalliergon moss, Pseudocalliergon turgescens
 Richardson's calliergon moss, Calliergon richardsonii
 Sarmenthypnum moss, Sarmenthypnum sarmentosum
 Scorpidium moss, Scorpidium scorpioides
 Smith's hygrohypnum moss, Hygrohypnum smithii
 Three-ranked spear-moss, Pseudocalliergon trifarium
 Varnished hook-moss, Hamatocaulis vernicosus
 Warnstorfia moss, Warnstorfia exannulata
 Order: Hypnales, Family: Brachytheciaceae
 Barnes' eurhynchium moss, Eurhynchium pulchellum var. barnesii
 Cedar moss, Sciuro-hypnum oedipodium
 Leiberg's brachythecium moss, Brachythecium leibergii
 Long-beaked water feathermoss, Platyhypnidium riparioides
 Matted feather moss, Brachythecium populeum
 Nelson's brachythecium moss, Brachythecium nelsonii
 Sharp point moss, Brachythecium oxycladon
 Steerecleus moss, Steerecleus serrulatus
 Stiff brachythecium moss, Brachythecium turgidum
 Trachybryum moss, Trachybryum megaptilum
 Order: Bryales, Family: Bryaceae

 Alpine bryum moss, Bryum alpinum
 Arctic bryum moss, Bryum arcticum
 Bryum moss, Bryum calobryoides
 Bryum moss, Bryum calophyllum
 Round-leaved bryum moss, Bryum cyclophyllum
 Bryum moss, Bryum dichotomum
 Bryum moss, Bryum lonchocaulon
 Bryum moss, Bryum pallens
 Drummond's pohlia moss, Pohlia drummondii
 Obtuseleaf pohlia moss, Pohlia obtusifolia
 Lagiobryum moss, Plagiobryum demissum
 Pohlia moss, Pohlia vexans
 Schleicher's bryum moss, Bryum schleicheri
 Waterfall copper moss, Haplodontium macrocarpum
 Zierian hump-moss, Plagiobryum zieri
 Order: Bryales, Family: Catoscopiaceae
 Black golf club moss, Catoscopium nigritum
 Order: Dicranales, Family: Dicranaceae
 Acuteleaf dicranum moss, Dicranum acutifolium
 Blytt's kiaeria moss, Kiaeria blyttii
 Cynodontium moss, Cynodontium tenellum
 Dicranella moss, Dicranella palustris
 Dicranella moss, Dicranella subulata
 Dicranoweisia moss, Dicranoweisia cirrata
 Dicranum moss, Dicranum angustum
 Dicranum moss, Dicranum spadiceum
 Fragile leaf dicranum moss, Dicranum fragilifolium
 Greville's dicranella moss, Dicranella grevilleana
 Longleaf paraleucobryum moss, Paraleucobryum longifolium
 Olympic dichodontium moss, Dichodontium olympicum
 Paraleucobryum moss, Paraleucobryum enerve
 Schreber's dicranella moss, Dicranella schreberiana
 Sickle kiaeria moss, Kiaeria falcata
 Silky forklet moss, Dicranella heteromalla
 Starke's kiaeria moss, Kiaeria starkei
 Order: Dicranales, Family: Ditrichaceae
 Ambiguous ditrichum moss, Ditrichum ambiguum
 Cylindrical trichodon, Trichodon cylindricus
 Incline distichium moss, Distichium inclinatum
 Order: Hypnales, Family: Fabroniaceae
 Silver hair moss, Fabronia pusilla
 Order: Fissidentales, Family: Fissidentaceae
 phoenix moss, Fissidens fontanus
 Order: Leucodontales, Family: Fontinalaceae
 antifever fontinalis moss, Fontinalis antipyretica
 Order: Funariales, Family: Funariaceae
 American funaria moss, Funaria americana
 common bladder moss, Physcomitrium pyriforme
 Hooker's physcomitrium moss, Physcomitrium hookeri
 rusty cord-moss, Entosthodon rubiginosus
 Order: Grimmiales, Family: Grimmiaceae
 Agassiz's schistidium moss, Schistidium agassizii
 aquatic racomitrium moss, Racomitrium aquaticum
 Britton's dry rock moss, Grimmia brittoniae
 curved dry rock moss, Grimmia incurva
 fascicled racomitrium moss, Racomitrium fasciculare
 grimmia dry rock moss, Grimmia laevigata
 grimmia dry rock moss, Grimmia mollis
 pygmy racomitrium moss, Niphotrichum pygmaeum
 racomitrium moss, Bucklandiella brevipes
 racomitrium moss, Racomitrium heterostichum
 varied racomitrium moss, Racomitrium varium
 western racomitrium moss, Racomitrium occidentale
 Order: Hypnales, Family: Hypnaceae
 Callicladium moss, Callicladium haldanianum
 herzogiella moss, Herzogiella striatella
 herzogiella moss, Herzogiella turfacea
 hypnum moss, Hypnum callichroum
 hypnum moss, Hypnum procerrimum
 platygyrium moss, Platygyrium repens
 recurved hypnum moss, Hypnum recurvatum
 Order: Hypnales, Family: Leskeaceae
 Claopodium moss, Claopodium crispifolium
 Order: Leucodontales, Family: Leucodontaceae
 Dendroalsia moss, Dendroalsia abietina
 Order: Bryales, Family: Meesiaceae
 Short-tooth hump-moss, Amblyodon dealbatus
 Angled paludella moss, Paludella squarrosa
 Meesia moss, Meesia longiseta
 Three-ranked hump-moss, Meesia triquetra
 Broad-nerved hump-moss, Meesia uliginosa
 Order: Bryales, Family: Mniaceae
 cinclidium moss, Cinclidium stygium
 Leucolepis umbrella moss, Leucolepis acanthoneuron
 Order: Leucodontales, Family: Neckeraceae
 Douglas' neckera moss, Neckera douglasii
 Order: Orthotrichales, Family: Orthotrichaceae
 Mougeot's amphidium moss, Amphidium mougeotii
 orthotrichum moss, Orthotrichum praemorsum
 Order: Pottiales, Family: Pottiaceae
 Bartram's tortula moss, Syntrichia bartramii
 convoluted barbula moss, Barbula convoluta
 didymodon moss, Didymodon brachyphyllus
 didymodon moss, Didymodon ferrugineus
 Heim's desmatodon moss, Hennediella heimii
 flamingo moss, Tortula cernua
 lamella pterygoneurum moss, Pterygoneurum lamellatum
 lime-seep eucladium moss, Eucladium verticillatum
 Norwegian tortula moss, Tortula norvegica
 obtuseleaf desmatodon moss, Desmatodon obtusifolius
 oxystegus moss, Trichostomum tenuirostre
 pseudocrossidium moss, Pseudocrossidium obtusulum
 rigid didymodon moss, Didymodon rigidulus var. gracilis
 sessile pterygoneurum moss, Pterygoneurum subsessile
 short-beaked aloe-moss (Aloina brevirostris)
 toothed phascum moss, Phascum cuspidatum
 tortella moss, Tortella inclinata
 tortula moss (Syntrichia papillosissima)
 tortula moss, Tortula caninervis
 tortula moss, Tortula muralis
 twisted tortella moss, Tortella tortuosa
 wideleaf crumia moss, Crumia latifolia
 wideleaf stegonia moss, Stegonia latifolia
 Order: Hypnales, Family: Pterigynandraceae
 myurella moss, Myurella tenerrima
 Order: Grimmiales, Family: Ptychomitraceae
 Gardner's ptychomitrium moss, Ptychomitrium gardneri
 Order: Schistostegales, Family: Schistostegaceae
 luminous moss, Schistostega pennata
 Order: Seligeriales, Family: Seligeraceae
 acute blindia moss, Blindia acuta
 Donn's small limestone moss, Seligeria donniana
 Order: Funariales, Family: Splachnaceae
 acuminate dung moss, Tayloria acuminata
 entire-leaf nitrogen moss, Tetraplodon mnioides
 lingulate dung moss, Tayloria lingulata
 pinkstink dung moss, Splachnum sphaericum
 serrate dung moss, Tayloria serrata
 toothed-leaf nitrogen moss, Tetraplodon angustatus
 Order: Hypnales, Family: Thamnobryaceae
 Bigelow's porotrichum moss, Porotrichum bigelovii
 Necker's thamnobryum moss, Thamnobryum neckeroides
 Order: Bryales, Family: Timmiaceae
 Norwegian timmia moss, Timmia norvegica

Further reading

See also
 Coniferous plants of Montana
 Lichens of Montana
 Monocotyledons of Montana

References

Bryophyta of North America
Lycophytes
Mosses